Mequon Town Hall and Fire Station Complex is an Art Deco building complex in Mequon, Wisconsin, United States, that was built in 1937 as a Works Progress Administration project.  It was listed on the National Register of Historic Places in 2000.

Built as a town hall in 1937, the building functioned as the city hall when Mequon incorporated in 1957.  The fire department moved in the 1980s to the nearby Mequon Safety Building on at the intersection of Mequon Road and Buntrock Avenue.  An additional fire station was also built on Port Washington Road, north of Mequon Road.

References

Art Deco architecture in Wisconsin
Buildings and structures in Ozaukee County, Wisconsin
Fire stations completed in 1937
Government buildings completed in 1937
National Register of Historic Places in Ozaukee County, Wisconsin
Fire stations on the National Register of Historic Places in Wisconsin
City and town halls on the National Register of Historic Places in Wisconsin
Works Progress Administration in Wisconsin
1937 establishments in Wisconsin